Gamsberg Nature Reserve is a protected reserve of Namibia, located west of Rehoboth. Within the reserve we find the flat-topped Gamsberg mountain. With its 2347 m above sea level it is said to be the third highest mountain in Namibia. The mountains separating the Namib Desert form the Khomas highlands.

In this area, it is possible to observe stars with little or very little light pollution.

References

Namibian savanna woodlands
Nature reserves in Namibia